Artak Grigoryan (born 19 October 1987) is an Armenian professional footballer who plays as a midfielder for the Armenian Premier League club Alashkert FC. Artak is also a member of the Armenia national football team, and has participated in 5 international matches since his debut at home friendly match against Iran on 11 August 2010.

Career statistics

International

Scores and results list Armenia's goal tally first, score column indicates score after each Armenian goal.

Honours

Club
Alashkert
 Armenian Premier League: 2015–16, 2016–17, 2017–18, 2020–21
 Armenian Cup: 2018–19
 Armenian Supercup: 2016, 2018, 2021

Ulisses FC
 Armenian Premier League: 2011

References

External links
 Artak Grigoryan scored twice during 5 minutes giving a 1:2 victory to his team
 Artak Grigoryan has joined the national team
 Artak Grigoryan was called to National Team
 Artak Grigoryan was called to National Team

1987 births
Living people
Footballers from Yerevan
Armenian footballers
Armenia international footballers
FC Ararat Yerevan players
Ulisses FC players
Armenian Premier League players
FC Alashkert players
Association football midfielders